Prevotella intermedia (formerly Bacteroides intermedius) is a gram-negative, obligate anaerobic pathogenic bacterium involved in periodontal infections, including gingivitis and periodontitis, and often found in acute necrotizing ulcerative gingivitis. It is commonly isolated from dental abscesses, where obligate anaerobes predominate.
P. intermedia is thought to be more prevalent in patients with noma.

P. intermedia use steroid hormones as growth factors, so their numbers are higher in pregnant women. It has also been isolated from women with bacterial vaginosis.

See also 
 Oral microbiology
 List of bacterial vaginosis microbiota

References

External links 
 Type strain of Prevotella intermedia at BacDive -  the Bacterial Diversity Metadatabase

Bacteroidia
Inflammatory diseases of female pelvic organs
Vagina
Reproductive system
Gynaecology
Sexual health
Bacterial vaginosis